"Jungle Boogie" is a funk song recorded by Kool & the Gang for their 1973 album Wild and Peaceful. It reached number four as a single, and became very popular in nightclubs. Billboard ranked it as the number 12 song for 1974, despite there being as many as 36 No. 1 singles that year.

Background
The song's spoken main vocal was performed by the band's roadie Don Boyce. An instrumental version of the tune with an overdubbed flute part and additional percussion instruments, titled "Jungle Jazz", appeared on the album Spirit of the Boogie. The song is noted for the Tarzan yell heard at the song's end and the grunting, panting and scatting heard throughout.

Track listing
De-Lite Records - DE-559:

Certifications

Chart performance

References

Kool & the Gang songs
1973 songs
Funk songs
Mercury Records singles
Songs written by Ronald Bell (musician)
Songs written by Claydes Charles Smith
Songs written by Robert "Kool" Bell
Songs about dancing
1973 debut singles
Screamin' Jay Hawkins songs